Bolshaya Dobrinka is a rural locality (a selo) and the administrative center of Bolshedobrinskoye Rural Settlement, Ertilsky District, Voronezh Oblast, Russia. The population was 495 as of 2010. There are 11 streets.

Geography 
Bolshaya Dobrinka is located 6 km northeast of Ertil (the district's administrative centre) by road. Ertil is the nearest rural locality.

References 

Rural localities in Ertilsky District